The 1992–93 snooker season was a series of snooker tournaments played between August 1992 and May 1993. The following table outlines the results for ranking, minor-ranking and the invitational events.


Calendar

Official rankings 

The top 16 of the world rankings, these players automatically played in the final rounds of the world ranking events and were invited for the Masters.

New professionals
The World Professional Billiards and Snooker Association accepted its largest intake to date, 154 new players, bringing the total to 719 (excluding 27 billiards-only members). The new professionals included world amateur champion Noppadon Noppachorn, world under-21 champion Ronnie O'Sullivan, John Higgins (who won the junior event at the 1991 World Masters), Indian amateur champion Yasin Merchant, the fifth-ranked women's player Tessa Davidson, and future multiple ranking event winners Dominic Dale, Stephen Lee, Joe Perry and Mark Williams.

Notes

References

External links

1992
Season 1993
Season 1992